Sara Fratini (born in Puerto Ordaz, Venezuela, in 1985)  is an illustrator, artist, street artist and manager of cultural organisations and is known for her illustrations with black lines and original characters.

Biography 
Fratini was born in Puerto Ordaz (Venezuela) in 1985 where she lived before going to Spain to study fine arts at the Complutense University of Madrid. In 2012 she moved to Italy to continue drawing. She founded La Guarimba International Film Festival where every year she has organized an exhibition of posters of artists from all around the world. Since 2016 she has also promoted the festival Cinemambulante in Amantea. Thanks to the popularization of her work on social media such as Facebook, Instagram and Twitter, she received sufficient interest in her illustrations to obtain her first contract with a publishing house.

Artistic style 
Her artwork is characterized by the black lines on white background with a touch of pink or red. In her illustrations, we observe a female character with a curvy figure with messy hair (the long hair is associated with memories).

Through her artworks she opts for a social critique in terms of beauty standards and the pressure imposed by the publicity: she draws "real women" with curves, joys and fears, coming from the feminism who fights against the inequality.

Work 
Fratini brings visibility to her work with social media.

In 2015, the publishing house Lumen launches her first illustrations book with the title La buena vida, in which her iconic character is a curvy woman in black and white with a touch of pink who flirts with her fears, without losing her enthusiasm for life.  Sergio Andreu, from La Vanguardia, defines her work as "girls like swirls covered with a skein of hair, images of women with uninhibited attitude and optimistic view".

In 2016 with the same publisher Sara launches  Una tal Martina y su monstruo. In this book, she names her character Martina Rossetto (inspired by her friend). the protagonist is a young voluptuous girl who faces her fears: a monster walking beside her who represents the insecurities and the internal conflicts of people.

In 2019, she launches an illustration book for children African-meninas Liderazgo Femenino en el continente Africano (African-meninas Women's leadership on the African continent), coordinated by Karo Moret Miranda, who fictions the biographies of African women leaders.

In addition to her illustrations, she also did numerous murals in large format in places such as Madrid, Málaga, La Palma, Ciudad of Soria,  Sicily, Treviso, Puglia, Calabria, Saint Louis and the island of Ngor. Her murals are part of art projects which invited Sara Fratini to participate in the drawing on different topics. In  Malaga she paints the side of the faculty of fine arts of University of Málaga on a request of Amnesty International,  UMA Refugee Support Planet of the International Film festival of La Guarimba. The fresco which was 18 meters long and 1.5 meters high allowed her to become a finalist of the World Illustration Awards of the Association of Illustrators in 2017.

In 2019, Sara Fratini is invited by the street art project  Muros Tabacalera of Madrid for the co-directing of the promotion of plastic arts of the Ministry of Culture and sports of Spain. Sha draws one of the murals of  Tabacalera de Madrid.

 (2013). Letters from my own room: collection 2013. Madrid: Ed. Verkami. Authors: Irusta Rodríguez, E. et Fratini, S. .
 (2015). La buena vida. Barcelone: Ed. Lumen. Author: Fratini, S. .
 (2016). Una tal Martina y su monstruo. Barcelone : Ed. Lumen. Author : Fratini, S. .
 (2019). African – Meninas: women's leadership on the African continent. Barcelona: Ed. Wanafrica. Authors: Moret Miranda, K., et al. Illustrations: Fratini, S. and Cebrián, A. .

References 

1985 births
Living people
21st-century women artists
Women illustrators
Venezuelan women artists
Women muralists